Dieker may refer to:

 Chris Dieker (born 1987), American football player
 Miller–Dieker syndrome, micro deletion syndrome

German-language surnames